Zizina antanossa, the dark grass blue or clover blue, is a butterfly of the family Lycaenidae. It is found in all of Africa, including Madagascar and Réunion.

The wingspan is 20–24 mm for males and 21–28 mm for females. Adults are on wing year-round in warm areas, with peaks from October to November and from March to April in southern Africa.

The larvae feed on Desmodium and Indigofera species.

References

Polyommatini
Butterflies of Africa
Lepidoptera of Mozambique
Butterflies described in 1877
Taxa named by Paul Mabille